Gang is an album by Johnny Hallyday, written and produced by Jean-Jacques Goldman and released in December 1986.

Track listing
 "L'envie"
 "Je t'attends"
 "J'oublierai ton nom"
 "Toute seule"
 "Je te promets"
 "Laura"
 "Tu peux chercher"
 "Dans mes nuits... on oublie"
 "Encore"
 "Ton fils"

Source: Gang track listing

References

1986 albums
Johnny Hallyday albums
Philips Records albums